Pompilus may refer to:
 Pompilus (wasp), a genus of wasps in the family Pompilidae
 Pompilus, a genus of fishes in the family Centrolopidae; synonym of Centrolophus
 Pompilus, a genus of fishes in the family Carangidae; synonym of Naucrates
 Pompilus (mythology), a Greek mythological character